Pondok Pesantren Walibarokah Burengan Banjaran Kediri (Walibarokah Islamic Boarding School) is a pesantren (Islamic boarding school) located in Kediri, East Java. Run by the Wali Barokah Foundation, the school was founded in 1950 by Nurhasan Al Ubaidah, who wanted to teach Islam to help Indonesia achieve a just and prosperous society both materially, spiritually and morally.

Nurhasan Al Ubaidah initially gave Koran recital lessons to 25 pupils at a mosque owned by Mbah Damah, who was known as the rich man of the village of Burengan, Kediri district. Nurhasan later bought a house at Jalan Kenari No. 9, adjacent to Mbah Damah's mosque. The house eventually developed into Burengan Banjaran Kediri Islamic Boarding School.

Toward the end of 1971, Nurhasan's health was declining, so the school's management came under the Islamic Employees Foundation (LEMKARI), led by Bachroni Hartanto.

Nurhasan died on 11 March 1982. Almost one year later, on 3 May 1983, his heirs, represented by Abdul Dhohir, handed management of the school to LEMAKRI founder Raden Eddy Masiadi and his associates Bachroni Hartanto, Soetojo Wirjo Atmodjo, Wijono and Nurhasjim. 

Under the management of LEMAKRI, the school underwent further development, including construction of the DMC building, the Wali Barokah Building (the main block for classes) and the 99-meter high Asmaul Husna minaret, which has a gold-plated dome and can be seen from various corners of Kediri. Asmaul Husna is listed as the tallest minaret in Indonesia.

Legality 
Legal Entity: Foundation Deed Number: 08 Date June 18 and No. 09 Date 22 September 2010. Authorized by the Minister of Justice, dated October 18, 2010, Number AHU.4294.AH.01.04.

Purpose 
The school's objective is to improve the quality of civilization, life, and the dignity of the public, nation and the state, as well as developing well-rounded Indonesian citizens.

Facilities 
The school has a campus of 3.4 hectares and a capacity for 2,000 students and about 50 administrators and teachers. Boy and girl boarders are accommodated in different buildings separated by a mosque.

The school's auditorium was inaugurated by former housing minister Siswono Yudo Husodo.

The school has about 1,500 tables and chairs for Al-Quran recitals. Additional assets include four vans, two trucks, one minibus and 20 motorcycles. The school also has a library and computer facilities, as well as rooms for sewing lessons and cooking lessons. There is also a cooperative selling daily necessities and books. There is a drinking water dispenser used for the welfare of the entire academic body.

One thing that is striking is that these facilities over the look clean and well groomed and did not impress the general untidiness that is one hallmark of the boarding school. This is probably not lost on the role of sexy Hygiene cottage that can empower all existing resources on campus.

Education System 
The school aims to provide its students with morality, piety, skills and independence. In the field of morals, the school wants its pupils to be moral, well-mannered, and polite in society and family relationships. Graduates are expected to be of noble character, able to get along with people, respect the elderly, and comply with all regulations and laws. In the field of science, the school aims to make its students knowledgeable, including in Islamic studies. In terms of skills and independence, this school is determined to print the insane self. Therefore, in addition to regular classes, the students also learn practical skills, such as sewing, embroidery, masonry, woodworking, electronics, workshops and agriculture. It is therefore expected that graduates will be equipped with skills that enable them to support themselves independently from their parents.

The enrollments and teaching systems at Pondok Pesantren Walibarokah are not as rigorous as those of a formal school. For example, the school can accept new students at any time. Students can sit tests and graduate whenever deemed ready. While the school's learning system is implemented in a classical style, group learning is individualized.

Curriculum 
Pondok Pesantren Walibarokah Burengan Banjaran Kadiri is a 'traditional huts plus'. In this case not only the students were taught the science of religion, but also equipped with skills that can create human resource of skilled and independent and based on faith and piety to God. In general it can be said that the education system in these boarding schools are non-formal. In this connection, the education system does not recognize the existence of a formal level and the end of the school year. The students are grouped on the basis of specialized books and absorption of science is taught. Any students who feel ready to apply for graduation exams.

There are a variety of learning groups according to level of competence of each class of students ranging from children, beginners, to grade for the exam preparation. There are at least nine groups of learning that is Cabe Rawit (age 5–12 years), Writing Arabic, reading the Qur'an, Tafseer Lambatan Java, Indonesia Lambatan Tafseer, Tafseer speed of Java, Indonesia Tafseer speed, Exam / Test, and Advanced / Intermediate .

In the group of Cabe Rawit learning, the lessons learned is rote prayers prayer, the practice of prayer, daily prayer recitation, thoharoh, write Arabic and Pegon, moral education. Write Arabic learning in the group of subjects taught Hijaiyah write letters, write Pegon, Pegon material. The learning group were given a lesson Reading Quran recitation and reading materials. Meanwhile, group learning Java Tafseer Lambatan lessons Koran and Hadith studies in the Java language, along with material lambatan group, while the interpretation given Lambatan Indonesian in Indonesian. Likewise, the speed of learning both Javanese and Indonesian language material is the same except that conveyed in the Indonesian language added by the group velocity of matter.

Meanwhile, group learning exam / test (three months) provides more comprehensive lessons are: reading the Qur'an, Tafseer Qur'an, Da'wah Methods, Management, Legal Counseling, Health Counseling, and Keputrian. The learning groups Skilled / Advanced lasts for 1 year with a gain material Kutubussitah Tafseer (Assessment six sahih hadith).

Teaching Material 
Principal materials used in the learning process at Pondok Pesantren Walibarokah Burengan Banjaran Kadiri is the original source of Islam is the Qur'an and Hadith. Clerics and students make use of both books as a primary source. The books that are secondary works of the scholars are not used. It is true that almost all boarding schools based on the Qur'an and Hadith, but the teaching materials that are used indirectly in studies both books, but using the books of secondary works of great scholars such previous books of jurisprudence, monotheism, and so on. In addition to the two major books were also taught some additional knowledge such as science tawid, writing Arabic, Arabic, Nahwu, Sorof, Usul Fiqh, Hadith Mustholah, and so on. Meanwhile, the material consists of various skills courses in accordance with their talents. While the material relating to the community and governments, this cottage teach sports, social service, the Indonesian language, methods of propagation, management, and so on.

Book of the Qur'an into a book of the same study materials used by the general public such as publications Toha Son, Mount Agung, and so on. Often the book of the Koran used by the students and clerics from the issue of Middle Eastern countries, particularly Beirut. This publication is obtained when the students perform the pilgrimage in Mecca or entrusted to prospective pilgrims to be able to buy there. Sometimes they get out of the right by-by their friends who had just come from Mecca. Often the books of foreign publications serves a double as well as teaching materials and pride on display in the cupboard. Of course the books of hadith kiab purchased in Mecca or Medina is a great books of hadith. However, there is also acquire it by buying books from book stores in Indonesia.

Usually the book the Koran used by clerics and students of the book 'vacancies' in the sense not been given a translation book. The students, especially students beginners, prefer the book the Qur'an which sheets the pages have a wide space that allows them to fill it with meaning taught by the clerics on the sidelines in between existing rows.

Teaching materials is subject to two books of hadith or sunna. This book is a book compiled by the hadith collector that contains all the thoughts, words, actions and models of the Prophet Muhammad. Testimony from people who still had time to sit with the founder of Pondok Pesantren Walibarokah Burengan Banjaran Kediri namely KH Nur Hasan Al Ubaidah said that clerics were mastering Hadith (gives meaning and description) as much as 49 types of Hadith that the set consists of 6 hadith which are usually categorized as kutubussitah (the level of validity is recognized all except the Shiite sect of Islam and some sects that deny the legitimacy of the hadith of the Prophet) and the rest are various hadith complement. The books of hadith kutubussitah consists of a set of hadith compiled by Buchori, Muslim, Ibn Majjah, Abi Daud, Sunan Tirmidhi, and Nasa'i.

In addition to big book of hadiths, also found materials that form the set of books. Book of the set is footage laws or arguments from the Qur'an and Hadith compiled based on the field or specific topic such as Kitabussholah (Book of Prayer), Kitabudda'wat (book collection of prayers), Ilmi Kitaab (book concerning the obligation to learn the science of religion), Imaroh Kitaab (book about the priesthood), and so on. Berdbeda with the book of the Qur'an and Hadith, this set of books prepared by the boarding school. The arguments set forth in the books of this set is the basics of a strong and applicable law.

When viewed from the contents, the set of books is an introduction for the beginner or the new pilgrims. Use of the book for the beginner set is based on the consideration if they are directly learned from the books of course, the various types of deeds urgent must be done can not be practiced correctly. Therefore, if there is a new congregation then in addition they examine the books of large, were also given books to immediately charity set correctly so that if the die at any time they are in the correct practice. In this connection, the books of the hadith is the enrichment and deepening of teaching materials.

Teaching materials is also very important in maintaining the faith of the students is advice cleric who poured in the form of written text. Text is disseminated and become a good training materials for the students at the cottage pesatren Burengan and citizens in general LDII. Text this advice contains advice in the context of actual problems overcome by using the basics of Islamic law is the Qur'an and Hadith. In Islamic law scholar's advice is one of the basic form of Islamic law called consensus or ijtihad.

Learning Method 
In Islam, learning is essentially the process of moving messages from one person to another. Learning methods are used both in boarding school or teaching in the mosques followed by the pilgrims as usual is the method used by the Prophet. So there is a movement of purification in the method of learning. In Islam, since the prophet Muhammad and the caliphs and the companions, the process of moving the messages contained in the Qur'an and Hadith through the method of reading, writing, and listening in science communication is referred to as verbal communication. This is in accordance with the sayings of Prophet Muhammad: 'You hear (the science from me), then you heard by your students and your disciples heard ole pupils' (Hadith Abu Dawud). So the knowledge transfer methods in PPB includes two aspects as well as the verbal communication (oral communication) and written communication (written communication).

Therefore, this method is not applied only in Pondok Pesantren Walibarokah Burengan Banjaran Kediri but also throughout the cabin LDII the ordinary worshipers are familiar with teaching methods in schools. This method is a method of learning in which teachers convey the meaning and description as well as the historical decline in the verses or hadith in question. The material diampaikan by preachers came from his teacher and so connect to a dial-up to the Companions and the Prophet. Likewise, the students will deliver the materials to others to be proxies. So the methods of learning are mutually binding in scientific or teachers and students have a relationship that never broken like a chain-breaking teputus.

In this context, the implementation of pure Islamic teaching methods will condition purity and consistent teachings of Islam. These methods keep the thoughts in the direction reinterpret as against Islamic laws which would lead to divisions of religion. Indeed, ijtihad is recognized as one of the basic law but ijtihad is geared to provide solutions to actual problems with the legal basis of the Qur'an and Hadith.

Students are also encouraged to learn through reading books and discussing them teachers, who will offer approval or correction. If students have read a book in front of the teacher, who may accept the science of the students as legitimate. This method is called  munawalah.

Students Activity 
The students are usually awake or awakened at 2:00 o'clock in the morning to evening prayer (prayer tahajud, hajad prayer, prayer beads, etc.), dhikr, and the last third of the night prayer which is believed to be an efficacious time (works) for prayer to God. For students who are not sleepy and still has the spirit will continue until the prayer time before morning prayers. After performing the dawn prayer, the students then recite the Qur'an in general, namely reading, meaning, and description. Lectures held in the mosque Baitil A'la was followed by all the learning groups. They sat casually on the floor of the mosque by holding their respective books. This activity lasted until 06.00. After that the students then break. In general they are preparing to learn and there is also a laundry. They have breakfast from 07:00.

The lesson starts at 08.00 until 09.30 in accordance with their learning groups respectively. After resting for half an hour, they learn again from 10:00 until 11:00. Afterwards they were given the opportunity to break up the prayer dhohor. The next activity is a lunch and a break until 14.00. after that they received another lesson until the time of Asar prayers at around 15:00. After prayers they break while nderes or deepen the book alone or with friends or simply read the Qur'an.

After showering and eating their evening rushed to the mosque for maghrib prayer preparation. While waiting for the priest prayed, they usually read the Qur'an. After Maghrib prayers followed the advice of the caretaker cottage or from ustadz. This activity lasted until late evening prayer '. After evening prayers' continued with lessons until 10:00. After itu para students are welcome to bed rest. However, usually nderes before bed. They were awakened at 02.00 tonight. What is interesting is that after they have held up an apple in accordance with their respective groups and the roll call for evening prayers and the prayers of the last third of the night.

In addition to daily activities as described above there is also a weekly kgiatan. This activity Khusus to train the students to be able berorasi in public. This activity is conducted every Friday at 13:30 conducted in groups and take turns. There are no monthly activities are Khsusus in Pondok Pesantren Walibarokah Burengan Banjaran Kediri. Meanwhile, activity in the form of semi-annual or semiannual completing the Qur'an, then the next six months completing the Qur'an again, but the next six months instead of completing the Qur'an but completing khutubussitah (hadith book six) and then re-completing Al Qur ' s and so on. Usually this is not just completing activities followed by the students in PPB but also from other mini cottage which exist throughout Indonesia, not even a little did the citizens LDII from around the world who have the opportunity and accommodation costs follow the event. Another annual activity is the cottage romadhlon. This activity is filled with studies book marathon starting after morning prayers in the morning until 22:00. Even in the last ten days in the month romadhlon (nights Laylat al qodar) recitation of activities carried out up to 24.00. The number of students was also increased almost twice as many participants coming from outside the boarding school students Walibarokah Burengan Banjaran Kediri.

Social relationships with community

Assignment 
As previously explained that the recruitment of students in boarding school Burengan derived from both posts takmir-takmir mosque and from the pilgrims who voluntarily want to deepen their religious knowledge effectively in the lodge pesantren.7 The students who have completed the lessons in Pondok Pesantren Burengan usually directly assigned by the cottage to devote their knowledge in the mosques that are needed. As it is known that this mosque is a unit of the smallest community that actually has people directly. Hence the fact that this mosque takmir know for sure if they need additional preachers or not. They are usually menyampaiakn need for preachers to then manager in the city or county level to raise the Pondok Burengan. At present this is rarely a single mosque preachers have only one. Most every mosque has to have two to three preachers and even many of them have three preachers, especially in cities.

During the first assignment that preachers beginners jump in mosques to serve the pilgrims. They should consult with local preachers-preacher. In addition they must also coordinate with the managers or the local mosque takmir in the service of the people. Likewise, these young preachers must engage with the local congregation and the community around the mosque that may be only a small part recitation activities in mosques LDII. Thus the preacher very significant role in image formation LDII citizens at the local level. The young preachers should be able to act as role models for local pilgrims.

During the period of the assignment of the young preachers are usually not allowed to go home parent. Mental far they were prepared to get used to your parents and be independent. An interesting thing is that during the charge, the economic life of their 'bil ma'ruf' or sufficiently covered by the mosque is cultivated.

Once the assignment is completed, they were released to go home parent. Henceforth they must be prepared to be assigned to various new areas if they still wanted. For the next area (city or county level) will decide in the mosque where they must serve.

Practice Budi Luhur 
In learning in Pondok Pesantren Walibarokah Burengan Banjaran Kediri emphasized that an understanding of Koran and the hadith intellectually is not enough. The students emphasized to have affective and psychomotor Islamic as a manifestation of understanding of Islamic law. If an intellectual understanding of Islamic law are perhaps more related to personal life, but aspects of attitudes and behavior more in touch with others. Aspects of the latter is what will create pencintraan terahadp LDII citizens. Level of public acceptance of a motion brought by LDII relies heavily on aspects of behavior and attitudes of the preachers in particular and citizens in general LDII. Therefore, Pondok Pesantren Walibarokah Burengan Banjaran Kediri always stressed the importance of having a nobility or akhlaqul LDII karimah for all citizens.

The practice of nobility in the community includes several things, among others glorify and obey their parents, to glorify the clergy, nobility against fellow Muslims, and the nobility of the surrounding population and environment. Glorifying attitude and obedience to parents (while not immoral orders) is a charity sholih and at the same command from God, even if the parent was not a Muslim. Practice nobility to parents among other language-spoken with a soft or polite, when told to immediately implement if not maksiyat, when advised children should listen and not interrupt, love to help parents work at home, do not lie and honestly to them, and so on.

Be glorified to the clergy is an obligation. To the students and residents LDII always emphasized the importance of glorifying attitude to the board. This relates to the belief that they have a big share in the intellectual community. The scholars and preachers is also a 'Wasilah' or intermediary for the Islamic sciences. Some examples of attitudes and behaviors that demonstrate an attitude glorifying scholars include: call by dialing a polite, spoke in a voice low, if the cleric spoke then have to listen, not their backs while in the study, if the cleric made a mistake when teaching should not be insulted, and so on.

Against fellow Muslims also developed the attitude of nobility. Fellow Muslims to be built or brotherly attitude of Muslim brotherhood in Islam. Inside Burengan learning in boarding school, the spirit of Islam persaudaaan this was really very stressed. This, among others, can diliohat from the spirit and attitude that fellow Muslims are forbidden treasure to be taken illegally, fellow Muslims should not insult each other and dropping his name. In addition, it is stressed that a fellow Muslim could not be used to kill each other. Islamic moral teaching of this kind are very attractive as stock that is meaningful to students alumni Pondok Pesantren Walibarokah Burengan Banjaran Kediri.

LDII abouts in the midst of the people like fish in water. Therefore, moral guidance in Pondok Pesantren Walibarokah Burengan Banjaran Kediri also always stressed how important the alumni cottage build good relationships and partnerships with the communities in which they devoted their religious knowledge. They believe that the propaganda by deed (bil khal) become a great tool for mnyebarkan Islam. Some teachings in relation to the nobility to the public include: when meeting with tentangga greet, say hello when passing a group of people with a polite, mourn sedangminggal citizens by donating money, to visit a sick neighbor, participating in communal work, ask for permission if it can not following the RT activities, recognition of the shortcomings and forgiving, and so on.

In addition, the moral teachings that really emphasized in Pondok Pesantren Walibarokah Burengan Banjaran Kediri and even in mosques LDII the other is the presence of sublime nature that includes six pillars, compact, good cooperation, honest, trustworthy, mujhid muzhid (sparingly) . With the 'doctrine of' moral is expected alumni Pondok Burengan truly become citizens and good citizens who will be able to create a climate of peace in society.

Cooperation with local community 
The school is not a symbol of elitist Islamic knowledge, but rather aims to be part of the local community. In the economic field, Pondok Pesantren Walibarokah has established a retail unit which serves students and locals.

The school has a synergistic relationship with the Kediri district government to strengthen solidarity between scholars and local government officials. The school participates in an inter-faith society agency that addresses issues that must be solved together.

Pondok Pesantren Walibarokah on YouTube 
 Menara Asmaulhusna Ponpes LDII Wali Barokah Kediri
 Jamuan MUI Bersama LDII Jatim di Ponpes Wali Barokah Kediri
 Pondok Pesantren LDII Burengan Kediri Jawa Timur

References 
Jawa Timur

Pranala luar 

 Official Website of LDII
 Informasi Tentang LDII
 Nuansa Persada
 LDII Sidoarjo
 LDII Jatim
 Situs Resmi Pondok Pesantren Walibarokah Burengan Banjaran Kediri
 Ponpes Walibarokah Kediri
 Lembaga Dakwah Islam Indonesia

Pesantren in Indonesia